Catherine Mary Stewart (born 22 April 1959) is a Canadian actress. Her film roles include The Apple, Night of the Comet, The Last Starfighter and Weekend at Bernie's. She was also the original Kayla Brady in Days of our Lives.

Early life
Stewart was born on 22 April 1959, in Edmonton, Alberta, the daughter of Mary (Stewart) and John Ralph Nursall. Her parents taught at the University of Alberta, her mother a physiology teaching assistant and her father a biology professor. Stewart attended Strathcona Composite High School. She first took jazz dance lessons, and moved to London after high school to study dance and general performing arts, and where she passed the audition for her first movie, The Apple.

Career

In 1980, Stewart landed a role in The Apple, a musical science fiction cult film. During the production of The Apple, the director Menahem Golan took issue with her original name Mary Nursall and insisted she change it, which she did using her mother's maiden name.

After moving to Los Angeles, she obtained a role on the soap opera Days of Our Lives, playing the original Kayla Brady from January 1982 to December 1983. She also auditioned for projects like Death of a Centerfold: The Dorothy Stratten Story, against Jamie Lee Curtis. In 1984, she starred in two science fiction feature films, The Last Starfighter as Maggie Gordon and Night of the Comet as Regina Belmont. She later played a leading role in the teen comedy Mischief.

In the mid-1980s, Stewart appeared in two miniseries: Hollywood Wives (1985) and Sins (1986), where she played the younger version of Joan Collins's character. She made guest appearances on television series such as Knight Rider, Hotel, Alfred Hitchcock Presents and The Outer Limits. She starred in several made-for-TV movies such as Murder by the Book (1987), Passion and Paradise (1989), Perfect Harmony (1991) and Ordeal in the Arctic (1993). In 1989, she appeared as Gwen Saunders in the comedy film Weekend at Bernie's.

Beginning in the mid-1990s, she scaled back her appearances while raising her family. After her children had grown, she again started appearing in television and film roles, and expressed an interest in directing. In 2010, she appeared in the film A Christmas Snow. In 2016, she directed the short movie A Walk to Remember. She starred in the Hallmark holidays movies Rock N' Roll Christmas in 2019 and A Christmas Comeback in 2020.

Personal life
She is the sister of Alan Nursall, a scientist and media personality who reports on science news for the Canadian TV series Daily Planet and the Discovery Channel. Another brother, John Nursall, is a freelance writer and TV/film documentary director and producer.

She was married to actor John Findlater in 1983 and divorced in 1985. She married Richard Allerton in 1992. She has a daughter and a son and lived in Brooklyn, New York, as of 2013.

Filmography

Film

Television

References

External links

 
 
 
 Interview with Catherine Mary Stewart at Classic Film & TV Cafe, 27 January 2014

1959 births
20th-century Canadian actresses
21st-century Canadian actresses
Actresses from Edmonton
Canadian expatriate actresses in the United States
Canadian film actresses
Canadian soap opera actresses
Canadian television actresses
Living people